Robert Blizzard may refer to:

 Bob Blizzard (1950–2022), British Labour Party politician
 Robert M. Blizzard (1924–2018), American pediatric endocrinologist